Eamonn Holmes  (born 3 December 1959) is a Northern Irish broadcaster and former journalist. Holmes co-presented GMTV for twelve years between 1993 and 2005, before presenting Sky News Sunrise for eleven years between 2005 and 2016. From 2006 until August 2021, he co-hosted This Morning with his wife Ruth Holmes on Fridays, during the school holidays only. In January 2022, Holmes joined GB News  to present its breakfast programme alongside Isabel Webster. He has also presented How the Other Half Lives (2015–present) and It's Not Me, It's You (2016) for Channel 5. Holmes is an advocate of numerous charities and causes including Dogs Trust, Variety GB and Northern Ireland Kidney Patients' Association.

Early life and education
Holmes was educated at Holy Family Primary School and St Malachy's College, Belfast.

Career

Early career
Before entering broadcasting, Holmes worked for a Dublin-based business magazine. In 1979, he joined Ulster Television, the ITV franchise contractor for Northern Ireland working as a host and reporter for the station's Farming Ulster programme. Afterwards, he teamed up with Ulster Television's sports reporters, Leslie Dawes (1922–2014) and Jackie Fullerton, to assist in covering sporting events in the province.

In 1982, Holmes was moved into news and current affairs reporting when he was tasked to anchor Ulster Television's flagship Good Evening Ulster programme. Holmes succeeded Gloria Hunniford who had presented the show since its launch in 1979. Holmes was the third choice to present the programme after trial runs by news reporters Gary Gillespie and Gerry Kelly.

In addition to his news and current affairs role, Holmes has also hosted other Ulster Television productions, including Miss Northern Ireland gala specials in 1985 and 1986. With Ulster Television, he won a Hometown Radio Award. He departed in 1986 to join the BBC.  At the corporation's Manchester studios, Holmes worked as a presenter on the daytime Open Air programme which was broadcast nationally on BBC1.

Television presenting

Holmes has presented coverage of snooker, horse racing, darts and tennis on television. He was also the presenter of ITV's coverage of the Phil Taylor vs. Raymond van Barneveld showdown at the Wembley Conference Centre in 1999.

In 1993, Holmes started working at GMTV, hosting the first show on 1 January 1993 with Anne Davies. He had a falling-out with his subsequent co-host Anthea Turner; however, they were reunited on a BBC NI show entitled The Friday Show in 2009.

Holmes presented the BBC National Lottery game show Jet Set between 2001 and 2007.

In April 2005, he left GMTV, stating the show had run out of real news and became celebrity obsessed shortly before his departure.

After leaving GMTV in April 2005, Holmes joined Sky News six months later to present the new-look Sunrise programme. He initially hosted the show with Lorna Dunkley between October 2005 and January 2007, then with Charlotte Hawkins from 2007 to 2014. Hawkins joined ITV in March 2014 and was replaced by Isabel Webster. In September 2016, Holmes announced his departure from the programme after eleven years.

Holmes presented SUDO-Q, a BBC quiz show between December 2005 and March 2007.

In 2006, Holmes began presenting ITV daytime programme This Morning on Friday mornings until 2021.

In December 2021, Holmes ended his contractual obligations with This Morning, meaning that the husband and wife duo no longer presented the show during school or bank holidays.

In 2006, Holmes hosted US game show The Rich List. In 2009, Holmes co-presented the ITV series The Feelgood Factor with Myleene Klass. He presented eight episodes of Songs of Praise from 2009 until 2014. In 2010, Holmes guest presented an episode of Have I Got News for You.

In 2014, Holmes and Ruth Langsford co-hosted a 10-part ITV daytime game show, Gift Wrapped. In 2015, Holmes and Langsford presented a six-part factual series for Channel 5 entitled Eamonn & Ruth: How the Other Half Lives. The programme returned for a second series in September 2016 and a third in June 2017.

In 2016, Holmes presented Channel 5 panel show It's Not Me, It's You. Vicky Pattison and Kelly Brook were team captains on the show.

Holmes was one of 3 relief presenters on Good Morning Britain between 2017 and 2018.

From March 2018, Holmes co-presented Do the Right Thing with Ruth Langsford on Channel 5.

In December 2021 it was announced that Holmes was joining GB News. It was later announced that he would present its new breakfast show with Isabel Webster from 4th January 2022.

in February 2020, Holmes lost a First Tier Tribunal (FTT) appeal regarding his status as a freelancer under IR35 rules, with the judge determining his contract with ITV's This Morning programme amounted to employment. Giving evidence in the proceedings, Holmes described himself as "..one of the best live television presenters in the country."

Other television work

In 2001, Holmes appeared on Lily Savage's Blankety Blank. In 2013, Holmes was a judge on the CBBC Blue Peter talent search for a new presenter, Blue Peter – You Decide.

Holmes has made four appearances on the long-running game show Who Wants to be a Millionaire?. The first time, he played with Alex Ferguson on 25 December 2004. On 25 August and 1 September 2007, he played with Kay Burley. On 20 May 2012, he returned with Ruth Langsford by his side. Finally, on 19 December 2013, to celebrate the end of Millionaire on ITV, Holmes re-appeared on the show with Alex Ferguson. Holmes has also appeared on celebrity editions of game shows including Fifteen to One, Call My Bluff, All Star Mr & Mrs, Tipping Point: Lucky Stars, Catchphrase and The Chase.

Holmes has also made regular appearances on Big Brother's Bit on the Side and in 2015, he was heavily tipped as a housemate for Celebrity Big Brother 16. He has been a panellist on numerous episodes of Through the Keyhole and appeared in ITV's Guess the Star in 2017. Since November 2017, he has provided the voiceover for Biggleton on CBeebies.

On 19 September 2021, Eamonn Holmes was featured on "The Meaning of Life" on RTE Television, Ireland.

Radio
Holmes' foray into radio broadcasting was at Downtown Radio, Northern Ireland's first commercial independent radio station, in the late 1980s.

From around 2003, Holmes presented The Eamonn Holmes Show on Radio 5 Live on Saturday mornings between 9 and 11 am for 6 years, last airing on 30 May 2009 as Holmes' contract with the BBC was not renewed. In 2005, Holmes hosted his own programme on London radio station Magic 105.4.

For a few weeks in 2008, Holmes took over Michael Parkinson's Sunday morning show on Radio 2.

In 2016, Holmes presented his own radio show on talkRADIO. The show was called Let's Talk With Eamonn Holmes and was broadcast on Saturdays from 6am to 8am and Sundays from 11am to 1pm.

From January 2018 till February 2020, Holmes presented the weekday drivetime show on talkRADIO.

Other work
Holmes writes a column for The People newspaper. His autobiography was released in May 2006. The autobiography is called This is MY Life, a reference to another famous Irish Eamonn – Eamonn Andrews, after whom he was named. The book reveals some of what occurred behind the scenes during his tenure at GMTV.

Controversies

In November 2009, Jon Culshaw appeared as Holmes on The Impressions Show in a series of three comedy sketches in which he was portrayed as having an appetite so uncontrollable that he eats a sofa, flowers and even a guest (Frankie Dettori), using the catchphrase 'I was fierce hungry, so I was'. Although Holmes had interviewed Culshaw and his co-star Debra Stephenson on This Morning to promote the show, after the programme aired the presenter instructed his lawyers to send a letter of complaint to the BBC. The letter resulted in an apology from the BBC along with a withdrawal of any future comedy sketches featuring Holmes. Both the complaint itself and the outcome of Holmes's legal action drew generally unfavourable criticism from media observers and online commentators.

While presenting This Morning in October 2011, Holmes described singer Jonathan Wilkes as "retarded" on air. He later apologised after complaints and calls for him to be sacked. Holmes said: "I have to say sorry to three or four of you who are upset because I used the word retarded. You seem to have taken it personally or think I am being insulting. I would never want to do that. There is this man who has an autistic child and said I insulted his child. I would never use it in that context. Sorry if that caused you offence".

In October 2011, Holmes provoked criticism by suggesting that a rape victim should take taxis in future, leading to accusations of victim blaming. A spokeswoman for ITV said: "Eamonn was in no way suggesting that the victim was in any way to blame for this horrific attack. His interview was carried out with the utmost care and compassion and his comments were intended to highlight safety advice."

On 12 May 2016, Holmes provoked criticism by comparing an attack by West Ham fans to the Hillsborough disaster. He later issued an apology and said that there was "no comparison" between the events at West Ham and Hillsborough.

In January 2020, Holmes was criticised after making remarks about Duchess of Sussex, Meghan Markle. One viewer complained to Ofcom that his description of Meghan Markle as "uppity" was a racist term to describe her. In a subsequent interview on talkRADIO, Holmes called her "awful, woke, weak, manipulative, spoilt and irritating" and said he did not think he would like her, despite saying he had never met her in person.

In April 2020, Holmes appeared to perpetuate the conspiracy theory that the building of 5G masts had led to the coronavirus pandemic. In a feature on This Morning surrounding "Fake News" related to the virus Holmes said that he "didn't accept mainstream media immediately slapping it down". He suggested that it was a sign of an "enquiring mind" to investigate the theory which had already been much debunked by experts. However, Holmes said that "it suits the state narrative" to deny the theory. Ofcom announced that it was investigating the incident. Holmes read a statement on the following day's programme which stated: "There is no connection between the present national health emergency and 5G, and to suggest otherwise would be wrong and indeed it could be dangerous." Ofcom received more than 400 complaints about the incident and later issued guidance to ITV on its coverage of the pandemic. Ofcom commented: "In our view, Eamonn Holmes' ambiguous comments were ill-judged and risked undermining viewers' trust in advice from public authorities and scientific evidence."

Personal life
In 1985, Holmes married his first wife, Gabrielle Holmes, with whom he has three children, Declan, Rebecca and Niall. They separated in 1994, due to Holmes' father's death and journalism career taking a toll on their marriage.

On 26 June 2010, Holmes married Ruth Langsford at Elvetham Hall, near Hartley Wintney, Hampshire. The couple sold exclusive rights to report on the wedding ceremony and the reception to Hello! magazine in a deal that saw the publication feature the event over two issues, in July 2010.

In 2006, Holmes was awarded an honorary degree by Queen's University Belfast. He has also received an honorary degree from the University of Staffordshire.

Holmes is a supporter of Manchester United. In December 2005, he opened the eulogies at the funeral of Northern Irish footballer George Best.

Holmes and Langsford are patrons of Dogs Trust. and the couple adopted their dog, Maggie from the charity in 2011. In 2014, the couple supported the Dementia Friends campaign, which is an Alzheimer's Society initiative.

In April 2015, Holmes became a celebrity ambassador for the children's charity, Variety GB. In January 2016, he became a patron of Northern Ireland Kidney Patients' Association. In March 2020, he and Langsford became patrons of The Amy May Trust.

In 2018 the Twitter accounts of both Holmes and Louis Theroux were targeted by Insinia Security to highlight a longstanding security flaw in Twitter's system.

On 26 October 2021, Holmes said that he had tested positive for COVID-19; he was fully vaccinated.

In October 2022, Eamonn Holmes fell at home and broke a bone which was sticking out of his shoulder. He was told to take four months off from his work as a presenter at the breakfast Show on GB News. He returned to work at GB News in February 2023.

Filmography
Television

Film

Radio

Awards and honours
Holmes was appointed Officer of the Order of the British Empire (OBE) for services to broadcasting in the 2018 New Year Honours. He collected his OBE from Queen Elizabeth II on 1 June 2018.

References

External links

Official website

1959 births
Living people
BBC Radio 5 Live presenters
British game show hosts
British sports broadcasters
Irish expatriates in the United Kingdom
Officers of the Order of the British Empire
Mass media people from Belfast
People educated at St Malachy's College
Sky News newsreaders and journalists
GMTV presenters and reporters
Television presenters from Northern Ireland
UTV (TV channel)
GB News newsreaders and journalists